Chondromorpha xanthotricha, is a species of millipedes in the family Paradoxosomatidae. It is native to South India and Sri Lanka. Two subspecies recognized.

Distribution
Although native to India and Sri Lanka, with shipping transportation, they have been introduced to many countries such as Taiwan, Philippines, Bali, New Caledonia, Samoa, Fiji, Mauritius, Guadeloupe, Jamaica, Suriname, and Puerto Rico. The species was recorded for the first time from Singapore in 2012.

Description
It is about 20–26 mm in length. Adults are chestnut brown to dark grey in color. They can move very fast.

Subspecies
 Chondromorpha xanthotricha hamuligerus Verhoeff, 1936
 Chondromorpha xanthotricha hirsutus Verhoeff, 1936

References

Polydesmida
Millipedes of Asia
Animals described in 1898